Samira Mezeghrane (born 29 December 1979) is a French long-distance runner. In 2020, she competed in the women's half marathon at the World Athletics Half Marathon Championships held in Gdynia, Poland.

References

External links 
 

Living people
1979 births
Place of birth missing (living people)
French female long-distance runners
French female cross country runners